Gyula Németh (November 2, 1890 – December 14, 1976), commonly known in English as Julius Németh was a Hungarian linguist and turkologist and member of the Hungarian Academy of Sciences.

Career
He worked at the Faculty of Humanities of the Eötvös Loránd University.

Works

References

External links
 Biography at Encyclopaedia Iranica
 Biography at University Library of Szeged 

Members of the Hungarian Academy of Sciences
1890 births
1976 deaths
Members of the German Academy of Sciences at Berlin
Turkologists